Roland (Roly) Denis Sussex OAM is Emeritus Professor of Applied Language Studies at the School of Languages and Comparative Cultural Studies of the University of Queensland, Brisbane, Australia. Sussex hosts a talkback program on language and linguistics on ABC radio in Queensland, Tasmania, South Australia and the Northern Territory and writes a weekly column, "Wordlimit", for the newspaper The Courier-Mail.

Sussex is a specialist in comparative linguistics, particularly of the European languages, and takes an interest in the Slavic languages within this group. He is also keenly interested in the changes experienced by different languages, such as the influence of American English on Australian English. He holds a PhD from the University of London in Russian Language and Comparative Linguistics.

He is an honorary life member of the Alliance française and patron of the Institute of Professional Editors.

Publications

References

Linguists from Australia
People from Brisbane
Living people
Year of birth missing (living people)
Place of birth missing (living people)